Stacy Haiduk (born April 24, 1968) is an American actress. She starred as Lana Lang in the syndicated superhero series, Superboy (1988-1992) and as Katherine Hitchcock in the NBC science fiction series, seaQuest DSV (1993-1994).  Haiduk also had leading roles in the short-lived NBC prime time soap opera, The Round Table (1992) and Fox supernatural horror series, Kindred: The Embraced (1996), and has appeared in a number of feature and made-for-television movies. 

Haiduk played Hannah Nichols in the ABC daytime soap opera All My Children (2007-2008), and Patty Williams and Emily Peterson on CBS soap opera The Young and the Restless (2009-2016), for which she received a Daytime Emmy Award nomination for Outstanding Supporting Actress in a Drama Series in 2017. In 2018, she began starring as Kristen DiMera and Susan Banks on the NBC soap opera, Days of Our Lives receiving another Daytime Emmy Award nomination in 2022.

Career
Haiduk was born Grand Rapids, Michigan. She achieved national fame when she was cast in the role of Lana Lang in the live-action superhero series, Superboy in 1988. After the series ended in 1992, Haiduk portrayed the leading role of Rhea McPherson, an aspiring FBI agent, in the short-lived Aaron Spelling-produced prime time soap opera, The Round Table. Haiduk's next significant role was in the NBC science fiction series, seaQuest DSV, in which she played Lt. Cmdr. Katherine Hitchcock, the chief engineer, and third in command of the high-tech submarine. She left the series after one season in 1994. She also had a female leading role in the short-lived NBC series Route 66, a remake of the 1960s series with the same name.

Haiduk made her film debut in the 1990 horror film Luther the Geek for Troma Entertainment, and later starred in Steel and Lace (1991). She starred in the made-for-television films, notable Danielle Steel's A Perfect Stranger (based on the novel of the same name by Danielle Steel) in 1994. In 1996, Haiduk went on to play a female vampire in the short-lived Fox supernatural horror series, Kindred: The Embraced. The following year, she had a recurring role in the Fox prime time soap opera, Melrose Place, appeared in the romantic comedy film Little City, and was lead actress in the thriller film The Beneficiary. She later guest-starred on Nash Bridges, Charmed, The X-Files, ER, NCIS, CSI: Miami, Crossing Jordan and CSI: Crime Scene Investigation. She had a recurring role as FBI Agent Elisa Thayer in Heroes from 2006 to 2007, and as Lisa Tabak in Prison Break from 2008 to 2009.

In 2006, Haiduk appeared in new supplemental material for the Superboy: The Complete First Season DVD release. She also appeared regularly on the ABC soap opera All My Children as Hannah Nichols from January 2007 through January 2008. From February 2009 to August 2010, she appeared on the CBS soap opera The Young and the Restless as Patty Williams, and also played Emily Peterson on the series. In July 2010, Haiduk was cast to play a prison warden on Days of Our Lives; she was subsequently dismissed and recast with former Santa Barbara actress Gina Gallego after three episodes, due to a scheduling conflict with The Chicago Code. Haiduk's appearances as Warden Smith aired in September 2010. She returned to prime time with the recurring roles on HBO series, True Blood from 2013 to 2014, and ABC Family series Twisted in 2014. In 2019, she starred in the Netflix thriller film, Home Is Where the Killer Is.

In 2018, it was announced that Haiduk had again been cast on Days of Our Lives, this time in the roles of Kristen DiMera and lookalike Susan Banks. In early 2019, she returned to the show, signing contract this time.

Personal life
In June 2010, an issue of Soap Opera Digest reported that Haiduk has been married to Bradford Tatum since November 11, 1997. The couple met on the set of seaQuest DSV. They have one daughter, actress Sophia Tatum. In 2009, Haiduk was the subject of an online boycott petition for apparently wearing a stuffed cat as a purse during the Daytime Emmy Awards. The cat was actually a prop used in her role on The Young and the Restless and not a purse.

Filmography

Film

Television films

Television series

Video games

Awards and nominations

References

External links
 The Official Stacy Haiduk Website
 

1968 births
Living people
American people of English descent
American people of French descent
American people of Hungarian descent
American people of Polish descent
American film actresses
American television actresses
21st-century American women